Inge I may refer to:

 Inge I of Sweden (died c. 1100), king
 Inge I of Norway (1135–1161), king